Jiaoxi Township is a rural township in Liuyang City, Hunan Province, People's Republic of China. It is surrounded by Chunkou Town on the north, Beisheng Town on the northwest, Dongyang Town on the west, Guankou Subdistrict on the east, and Jili Subdistrict on the south.

Administrative divisions
The township is divided into six villages, the following areas: Gaosheng Village, Jiaoxi Village, Changfeng Village, Hantian Village, Shuiyuan Village, and Jinyuan Village.

Geography
Liuyang River, also known as the mother river, flows through the township.

Wanfeng Lake and Shidong Lake are popular attractions in the township.

Economy
Tobacco and herbal medicine are important to the economy.

Education
 Jiaoxi Middle School

Transportation

Expressway
The Changsha-Liuyang Expressway in Hunan province leads to Changsha and Liuyang runs through the township.

National Highway
The G106 National Highway, which runs north through the towns of Chunkou, Longfu and Shegang to Pingjiang County, and the southeast through the subdistricts of Jili and Guankou and Jingang Town to Litian Town of Liling.

The G319 National Highway, runs west through the towns of Dongyang and Yong'an, and the southeast through the subdistricts of Jili and Guankou and Dayao Town to Shangli County.

Attractions
Quantai Academy, Shade Ancient Bridge and Pengjia Ancient Houses are well known tourist spots in the township.

References

External links

Divisions of Liuyang
Liuyang